Knefastia rouaulti is an extinct species of sea snail, a marine gastropod mollusk in the family Pseudomelatomidae, the turrids and allies.

Description

Distribution
This extinct marine species was found in Cuisien strata in Gan, France.

References

 Cossmann, 1923:  Le gisement cuisien de Gan, in-8°, Pau, 1923

rouaulti
Gastropods described in 1923